Forres railway station serves the town of Forres, Moray in Scotland. The station is managed and served by ScotRail and is on the Aberdeen–Inverness line, between Nairn and Elgin, measured  from Perth via the Dava route.

History

Prior to the Dava route opening, all services to the south began at Aberdeen (on the north-east coast). Problems occurred when connecting at Aberdeen from Inverness trains - Aberdeen was the terminus for two railway companies, and therefore had two separate stations: One served the east and the other was the starting point for services to the south (via the coast). Although they were connected by a bus, connections were often missed and passengers remained stranded after missing the daily connection south.

Plans for a more direct route via Carrbridge had been rejected by parliament as too ambitious. Engineer Joseph Mitchell planned an alternative route via Dava and work was completed on the line by August 1863.

Forres was chosen as the junction for the new mainline south, since it was the half-way point on the Inverness & Aberdeen Junction Railway between Inverness and Keith. Keith was also an important railway junction and the point where the line joined the GNSR and branches to the coast and Strathspey.

1858
The first railway station in Forres which was located at the end of Market Street. On the OS map for 1863, this road is named appropriately 'Old Station Road'.

The station building was located between the current track and signal box, and the former goods loop (which was the original main line, before the junction was constructed). This served trains from Inverness to connect with the GNSR in Elgin. The station building was demolished in the 1950s. It had been used as the stationmaster's house since the junction opened.

1863
The opening of the junction required a new 'triangular' station to be constructed to allow all trains entering Forres, from either the East or West, to access the new line directly on a curve. The three curved platforms, and three junctions, gave the new Forres station its distinctive layout.

The location of the new station was south-west of the existing Inverness-Aberdeen line. The original line was retained as a goods loop, with trains now leaving and re-joining the line (east-west) on a curve. Services from Inverness to Perth curved to the south on a junction at the west of the station, to arrive at the southbound platforms.

Both Inverness-Keith and Inverness-Perth trains had double platforms for trains travelling in both directions. Since it was the mainline south, generous platforms were constructed to accommodate the expresses.

Trains travelling from the east to the south had a single platform at the east of the station. This was not used for normal passenger services. The station was originally accessed from Tytler Street (originally 'Station Road'). Since the line and platform crossed the road, there was a gap in the east platform to allow the road into the station. The level crossing gates closed the entrance to the station, when the curve was used by trains.

Three individual signal boxes controlled the junctions and each point of the triangle:

Forres East
Forres West
Forres South

1955

During 1954–55, the station building was replaced with the current red brick building. This included a new ticket office, toilets and waiting rooms.

The original 1863 building was constructed out of wood. The current building is located directly in front of the site of the 1863 station.

2017
After lengthy discussions in Scottish Parliament to replace the old station at Forres with a brand new reconfigured station equipped with double platforms, Transport Scotland eventually confirmed in March 2014 that this would indeed be the case. A £170 million infrastructure improvement project was subsequently announced for the Aberdeen–Inverness line, to be completed by 2030. Included in this project were plans to re-site the station at Forres with an extended passing loop, along with signalling improvements. Further signalling and infrastructure improvements along the line were also announced, including the construction of two additional stations.

Plans for the new Forres station were revealed at a public meeting in March 2016 and initial construction work and track laying commenced in the summer of 2016. Once the new station was completed, the original Highland Railway station closed on 5 October 2017, after the last train of the night. The level crossing and signal box at Forres were also closed and all three structures were subsequently demolished. The new station opened on 17 October 2017 and track signalling was then transferred to a signalling centre in Inverness.

Goods yard
 Forres once had an extensive goods yard. Whisky from the Dallas Dhu distillery was moved from the distillery sidings in wagons, and coke used by the distillery was delivered via the yard. Locomotives were stored in a two-road engine shed equipped with coaling facilities and a turntable.

Closure and remains
The Inverness-Perth (via Forres) had become a secondary route following the eventual construction of the Inverness-Aviemore direct route by 1884. The Dava lines and platforms at Forres was eventually singled and a wall erected in its place of the down platform (now demolished).

The Dava route closed to passenger traffic on 18 October 1965 (as a result of the Beeching Axe) and goods services ended completely by 1968. A short section of the southbound platforms remains, whilst the trackbed is partially in use as a station car park.

The exit from the station building to the Dava platforms still exists. The original gates protect a now abandoned corridor, with all waiting rooms and facilities now bricked-up.

The east platform existed until the mid-1970s following closure of the junction to passengers in 1965 and to goods in 1967, after which the once extensive layout of Forres station was simplified to single track operations (with a passing loop to the east, at the former Forres East signal box). All traces of the part of the station has been obliterated by the construction of the Forres by-pass. For many years (until construction of the by-pass), one of the level crossing gates was retained for use as fencing beside the Royal Hotel.
 
The Inverness-Aberdeen down platform was closed in 1965 and exists abandoned in-situ, although the track was lifted at closure. The standard Highland Railways over-bridge was removed, but the concrete bases remain and indicate its location.

The signal boxes that controlled the west and the south junctions (Forres South, Forres West) have long gone, and no trace remains. The box at Forres East (latterly renamed 'Forres') remained in use until the old station was decommissioned on 6 October 2017. The box also supervised a level crossing and manual token exchanges between train drivers and the duty signaller would take place next to the box.

The goods yard is now completely demolished and track lifted. The site is now overgrown and awaits development. However, the semaphore signal, and a short section of access track from the east, still exists.

A single Highland Railway fencing post can be found at Robertson/Iowa Place, at the junction with Miekle Cruik. This was the location of a level crossing.

Other demolished features
The Nairn road crossed the railway on an over-bridge. This was located near to 'Old Bridge court' which was named in memory of the former railway bridge. No trace remains.

The Grantown road also crossed the railway, on an over-bridge at the foot of Mannachie Road. The line emerged just to the right of the road to Thornhill farm. Another over-bridge remains further up Mannachie rise, where the trackbed can be found in a cutting. It is part filled as part of a housing development. The trackbed can be easily found out of Forres as part of The Dava Way.

Facilities
The station has two platforms (linked by footbridge), with the ticket office and waiting room on platform 1 (both platforms are reversibly signalled). The main road that used to cross the line at Forres East level crossing has been diverted onto a new overbridge and a new larger car park provided. A shelter is located on platform 2, whilst both have customer help points, CIS displays, timetable boards and automated announcements to offer train running details.

Passenger volume 

The statistics cover twelve month periods that start in April.

Services
As of May 2022, there are seventeen daily departures from the station each way on weekdays and Saturdays. Most are through trains between Aberdeen and Inverness, but some trains start from or terminate at Elgin. One departure runs through to Edinburgh in the morning, and one in the evening runs to Stonehaven. On Sundays there are five through trains each way to Inverness and Aberdeen, with two more from Glasgow to Elgin via Inverness that call eastbound.

References

Bibliography 
 
 
 
 
 
 
  from 2001, with station developments mentioned as part of a flood protection scheme.

External links

 Railscot - Photos of Forres

Railway stations in Moray
Former Highland Railway stations
Railway stations in Great Britain opened in 1858
Railway stations in Great Britain closed in 1863
Railway stations in Great Britain opened in 1863
Railway stations served by ScotRail
1858 establishments in Scotland
Forres